KAVE (88.5 FM) is a broadcast translator rebroadcasting the variety format of KRVM-FM in Eugene, Oregon, serving the community of Oakridge, Oregon, United States.  The station is owned and licensed by Lane County School District 4J.

History
The station went on the air as KMKR on February 23, 2004.  On November 15, 2006, the station changed its call sign to the current KAVE.

Previous logo

References

External links

AVE
Lane County, Oregon
2004 establishments in Oregon
Radio stations established in 2004